North Albany is the Benton County district of the city of Albany, Oregon, United States. In 2007, it was estimated to have 7,286 of Albany's 49,000 people.

History
The first European settlers to come into the area arrived in the 1880s, along with the construction of the Lafayette Street railroad trestle for the Corvallis and Eastern Railroad, which crossed the Willamette River in the Albany area. William Peacock was one of North Albany's early settlers, once he purchased a 20-acre farm in 1883. In the 1890s, he built an Italianate Farmhouse-style home on the property that today still stands and is known as the Peacock House. During the same period of time, the steel bridge was built to connect street traffic from Albany to North Albany and later replace with Ellsworth Street Bridge in 1925.

Only until the 1930s did the area see a major growth, when the construction of the Laurel Heights subdivision commenced in North Albany, along with the Gibson Hill Water Association, to bring the first water district to North Albany.

In 1961, North Albany saw its first annexation from the city of Albany, covering most of the land from the river up to Hickory Street. Twenty years later, in 1981, Albany adopted a new urban growth boundary to contain the rest of North Albany, following along a different water district. Then, in 1991, voters approved annexation for the rest of the land inside the urban growth boundary. It formed what is now the North Albany District of Albany.

References

Unincorporated communities in Benton County, Oregon
Albany, Oregon
Former census-designated places in Oregon
Unincorporated communities in Oregon